Bakshi may refer to:

Indian title
Bakshi is a historical title used in India, deriving from Persian word for "paymaster", and originating as the title of an official responsible for distributing wages in Muslim armies.

 
 
 Bakshi Ghulam Mohammad, Prime Minister of Jammu and Kashmir from 1953 to 1964.
 Bakshi Tirath Ram Vaid, a soldier of British India.

Indian surname
Derived from the historical title, "Bakshi" came to be used as a surname among Hindus and Sikhs of the Punjab region in India.
 
  

 Amit S. Bakshi, Indian hockey player
 Anand Bakshi, Indian songwriter
 Chandrakant Bakshi, Indian author
 G. D. Bakshi, Major General of Indian Army
 Kanwaljit Singh Bakshi, New Zealand member of parliament
 Padumlal Punnalal Bakshi, Indian Hindi-language writer
 Praveen Bakshi,  Lieutenant  general of Indian army
 Ramprasad Bakshi (b.1894), Gujrati writer
 Rohit Bakshi (actor), Indian actor
 Rohit Bakshi (neurologist), American academic
 Sachindra Bakshi, Indian freedom fighter participated in kakori train robbery
 Tirath Singh Bakshi Deputy Inspector General of Police (DIG Police) during the British Raj
 Zorawar Chand Bakshi (b. 1921) Indian general

Jewish surname 
Bakshi is also a Jewish surname, from the Turkish word for garden.

 Eliyahu Bakshi-Doron, a former Sephardi Chief Rabbi of Israel
 Ralph Bakshi, American animator and film director

Other surname
 Aleksandre Bakshi, Georgian tennis player

Fictional characters

Byomkesh Bakshi, a fictional Indian-Bengali detective created by author Sharadindu Bandyopadhyay.
Hrundi V. Bakshi, the main character in the 1968 film The Party.

See also 
 Bakhshi 
 Bakshy (sometime spelled bakshi) a shamanic music by Turkish people from Norther Iran and Turkish countries

References

Persian words and phrases
Titles in India
Indian surnames
Hindu surnames
Surnames of Indian origin
Punjabi-language surnames
Kashmiri-language surnames
Jewish surnames